Don E. FauntLeRoy (born May 5, 1953) is an American cinematographer and director of films. He has collaborated with director Victor Salva on such films as Jeepers Creepers, Jeepers Creepers 2, Rosewood Lane, and Dark House.

He directed the Steven Seagal films Today You Die, Mercenary for Justice, and Urban Justice. He also directed Bering Sea Beast in 2013.

References

External links
 

Living people
1953 births
American cinematographers
American film directors